The X Factor was an Australian television reality music competition, based on the original UK series, to find new singing talent; the winner of which received a Sony Music Australia recording contract and a new car. The fourth season premiered on the Seven Network on 20 August 2012 and ended on 20 November 2012. The winner was Samantha Jade and her winner's single "What You've Done to Me" was released after the final. Jade was mentored throughout by Guy Sebastian, who won as mentor for the second year in a row. The main live shows was presented by Luke Jacobz, while season three finalist Johnny Ruffo presented the digital live streaming show The X Stream. Mel B, Guy Sebastian, Natalie Bassingthwaighte and Ronan Keating returned as judges.

The competition was split into several stages: auditions, super bootcamp, home visits and live shows. Auditions in front of the show's producers took place throughout February and March 2012. The successful auditionees chosen by the producers were then invited back to the last set of auditions that took place in front of the judges and a live studio audience in May 2012. After the auditions was super bootcamp, where all four judges worked together and collectively chose 24 acts, including six from each of the four categories: Boys, Girls, Over 25s and Groups. Following super bootcamp was the home visits stage, where each of the judges reduced their six acts to three, with help from guest mentors Alicia Keys, Kesha, One Direction and Usher. The live shows began on 17 September 2012.

The fourth season sparked controversy when contestant Josh Brookes was disqualified from The X Factor for behaving "in an inappropriate manner" on social media. He was later replaced by Carmelo Munzone. The grand final decider was watched by 1.92 million people, making it the highest rated television episode of the season.

Judges

In 2012 it was confirmed that Mel B, Sebastian, Bassingthwaighte and Keating would return for the series.

Selection process

Auditions

Auditions in front of the show's producers began in February 2012 in seven cities: Hobart (Hotel Grand Chancellor, 18 February), Launceston (Hotel Grand Chancellor, 19 February), Albury (Albury Entertainment Centre, 22 February), Dubbo (RSL Club Resort, 24 February), Darwin (Crowne Plaza Hotel, 26 February), Cairns (Shangri-La Hotel, The Marina Cairns, 28 February), Brisbane (Suncorp Piazza, 3–4 March), Newcastle (Hunter Stadium, 7 March), Sydney (Sydney Convention and Exhibition Centre, 10–12 March), Perth (Perth Convention and Exhibition Centre, 18 March), Adelaide (Adelaide Convention Centre, 20 March) and Melbourne (Flemington Racecourse, 24–26 March). Online auditions were also introduced into the season for the acts who missed out on auditioning in front of the producers. The successful auditionees chosen by the producers were then invited back to the last set of auditions that took place in front of the judges and a live studio audience. These auditions were held in three cities: Melbourne (Hisense Arena, 3–5 May), Gold Coast (Gold Coast Convention and Exhibition Centre, 11–12 May) and Sydney (Sydney Entertainment Centre, 17–19 May).

Super bootcamp
The super bootcamp stage of the competition saw all four judges working together, unlike in previous series where they disband to manage their own categories. It was filmed on 28, 29 and 30 May 2012. The first day saw the judges split the acts into four categories: Boys, Girls, Over 25s and Groups. Each category was given a list of four songs which they had to choose from to perform for the judges. At the end of the day, a third of the acts were sent home. On the second day, the remaining 74 acts were put into ensembles and were each given a song which they had to learn and perform for the judges. Each ensemble received vocal coaching from Gary Pinto and choreography practice from Squared Division. At the end of day, the judges sent 28 acts home. On the third day, the remaining 46 acts each individually performed one song to a live audience of one thousand. On the fourth day of super bootcamp, the judges narrowed down the acts to 24. Five from the Boys and six rejected soloists from the Girls categories were asked by the judges to form two groups, The Collective (boy band) and Black Ivory (girl band).

The 24 successful acts were:
Boys: Josh Brookes, Matt Cenere, Matt Gresham, Adil Memon, Carmelo Munzone, Jason Owen
Girls: Bella Ferraro, Shiane Hawke, Bella Hunter, Morgan Sheather, Angel Tupai, Vendulka Wichta
Over 25s: Danielle Blakey, Chris Cayzer, Samantha Jade, Justin Standley, Rob Vegas, Nathaniel Willemse
Groups: Black Ivory, D&D, Fourtunate, Good Question, The Collective, What About Tonight

Home visits
The final round of the selection process, the home visits, saw the remaining 24 acts travel to exclusive locations around the world to find out which judge would become their mentor. The Boys, Girls and Over 25s travelled to New York City, while the Groups visited London. Each judge reduced their six acts to three, with help from celebrity guest mentors. The Boys were assigned to Mel B and mentored by Usher, the Girls were assigned to Natalie Bassingthwaighte and mentored by Kesha, the Over 25s were assigned to Guy Sebastian and mentored by Alicia Keys, and the Groups were assigned to Ronan Keating and mentored by One Direction. During the first day of home visits, each act was given a private mentoring session with their mentor, ahead of their solo performance in front of their mentor and guest mentor the next day. After, the judges along with their guest mentors, narrowed down the contestants to three each.

Acts 

Key:
 – Winner
 – Runner-Up
 – Ejected

Live shows

Results summary
Colour key
 Act in Team Mel B
 Act in Team Guy
 Act in Team Natalie
 Act in Team Ronan

  – Act in the bottom two and had to perform again in the final showdown
  – Act received the fewest public votes and was immediately eliminated (no final showdown)
  – Act was ejected from the competition without singing or facing the public vote

Notes
– Josh Brookes was ejected from the show due to rule violations. Carmelo Munzone replaced him on the second live show.
– Sebastian was not present for this results show. As one of his acts (Nathaniel Willemse) was in the bottom two, a vote against What About Tonight was cast on Sebastian's behalf on the typical assumption that Sebastian would have voted against What About Tonight.

Live show details

Week 1 (17/18 September)
 Theme: Judges' Choice
 Celebrity performers: Ronan Keating ("Fires") and Guy Sebastian featuring Lupe Fiasco ("Battle Scars")
 Group performance: "Call Me Maybe"

 Judges' vote to eliminate
 Sebastian: Adil Memon – backed his own act, Samantha Jade.
 Mel B: Samantha Jade – backed her own act, Adil Memon.
 Bassingthwaighte: Adil Memon – stated that Jade had improved more.
 Keating: Adil Memon – based on the final showdown performance.

 Notes
 The Collective's performance of "Domino" debuted on the ARIA Singles Chart at number 35 on 24 September 2012.

Week 2 (25/26 September)
 Theme: Party All Night
 Celebrity performers: James Morrison ("I Won't Let You Go") and The Script ("Hall of Fame")
 Group performance: "R.I.P."/"How We Do (Party)" with Rita Ora

Judges' vote to eliminate
Sebastian: What About Tonight – despite his absence in the results show, an automatic vote was cast to save Nathaniel Willemse based on the usual assumption that he would have voted to save his own act.
Keating: Nathaniel Willemse – backed his own act, What About Tonight.
Bassingthwaighte: What About Tonight – stated she was not voting strategically.
Mel B: Nathaniel Williemse – could not decide and sent the result to deadlock.

With the acts in the bottom two receiving two votes each, the result went to deadlock and reverted to the earlier public vote. What About Tonight were eliminated as the act with the fewest public votes.

Notes
This week's live shows aired on Tuesday and Wednesday nights due to the Seven Network's coverage of the 2012 Brownlow Medal.
Sebastian was absent from the results show due to him traveling to New York to perform "Battle Scars" on the Late Show with David Letterman.
On 30 September 2012, the performances of three finalists entered the ARIA Singles Chart. The Collective's performance of "Footloose" debuted at number 41, Bella Ferraro's performance of "What Makes You Beautiful" debuted at number 62, and What About Tonight's performance of "Year 3000" debuted at number 97.
Josh Brookes was disqualified from the show and was replaced by Carmelo Munzone.

Week 3 (1/2 October)
 Theme: Top 10 Hits
 Celebrity performers: Lady Antebellum ("Need You Now") and Pink ("Try")
 Group performance: "Lolita"/"Untouched"/"4ever" with The Veronicas

Judges' vote to eliminate
 Bassingthwaighte: Justin Standley – backed her own act, Angel Tupai.
 Mel B: Justin Standley – stated that Tupai could go further in the competition.
 Sebastian: Angel Tupai – backed his own act, Justin Standley.
 Keating: Justin Standley – stated that Tupai was his biggest threat in the competition but chose not to vote strategically.

Notes
On 7 October 2012, the performances of two finalists entered the ARIA Singles Chart. The Collective's performance of "You Got It (The Right Stuff)" debuted at number 78, and Bella Ferraro's performance of "Big Yellow Taxi" debuted at number 84.
When Justin Standley was announced in the bottom two, he became the third Over 25 to land in the bottom two in three consecutive weeks, as the other two acts from that category already fell in the bottom two in their respective weeks (Samantha Jade in Week 1 and Nathaniel Willemse in Week 2).

Week 4 (8/9 October)
 Theme: Legends
 Celebrity performers: Labrinth ("Earthquake") and Birdy ("Skinny Love")
 Group performance: "I Can't Help Myself (Sugar Pie Honey Bunch)"/"What a Man"/"Land of a Thousand Dances" with Jessica Mauboy

Judges' vote to eliminate
Keating: Carmelo Munzone – backed his own act, Fourtunate.
Bassingthwaighte: Carmelo Munzone  – stated Fourtunate could improve more.
Mel B: Fourtunate – backed her own act, Carmelo Munzone.
Sebastian: Carmelo Munzone – based his decision on who he felt needed more work.

Notes
Nathaniel Willemse's performance of "The Scientist" debuted on the ARIA Singles Chart at number 75 on 14 October 2012.

Week 5 (15/16 October)
Theme: Songs from the 1980s
Celebrity performers: Reece Mastin ("Rock Star") and Psy ("Gangnam Style")
Group performance: "Do You Remember"/"So High"/"Down" with Jay Sean

Judges' vote to eliminate
 Sebastian: Angel Tupai – backed his own act, Samantha Jade.
 Bassingthwaighte: Samantha Jade – backed her own act, Angel Tupai.
 Keating: Angel Tupai – based on the final showdown performance.
 Mel B: Samantha Jade – based on the performances throughout the competition.

With the acts in the bottom two receiving two votes each, the result went to deadlock and reverted to the earlier public vote. Angel Tupai was eliminated as the act with the fewest public votes.

Notes
On Monday night, viewers were able to vote for the judge they would have liked to see perform the "Gangnam Style" dance routine on Tuesday night. Mel B won the vote, therefore she joined Psy to perform the "Gangnam Style" routine.
The Collective's performance of "Like a Prayer" debuted on the ARIA Singles Chart at number 65 on 21 October 2012.

Week 6 (22/23 October)
Theme: Latest and Greatest
Celebrity performers: Cher Lloyd ("Want U Back") and Matchbox Twenty ("She's So Mean")
Group performance: "Part of Me"

Judges' vote to eliminate
 Sebastian: Fourtunate – said that Ferraro had more potential and wanted to see her improve.
 Bassingthwaighte: Fourtunate – backed her own act, Bella Ferraro.
 Keating: Bella Ferraro – backed his own act, Fourtunate.
 Mel B: Fourtunate – said Ferraro had more potential and wanted to see her journey throughout the competition.
Notes
The Collective's performance of "Lego House" debuted on the ARIA Singles Chart at number 70 on 28 October 2012.

Week 7 (29/30 October)
Theme: Made in Australia
Celebrity performers: Little Mix ("Wings") and Ellie Goulding ("Anything Could Happen")
Group performance: "Touch" with Silver Sneakerz

Judges' vote to eliminate
 Bassingthwaighte: Samantha Jade – stated that Willemse can improve more.
 Keating: Nathaniel Willemse – based on the final showdown performance.
 Mel B: Samantha Jade – based on the final showdown performance; though stated that she was not impressed with either performance.
 Sebastian: Nathaniel Willemse – could not send either of his own acts home and sent the result to deadlock.

With the acts in the bottom two receiving two votes each, the result went to deadlock and reverted to the earlier public vote. Nathaniel Willemse was eliminated as the act with the fewest public votes.

Notes
On 4 November 2012, the performances of two finalists entered the ARIA Singles Chart. Bella Ferraro's performance of "Sweet Disposition" debuted at number 59, and Nathaniel Willemse's performance of "Red" debuted at number 91.

Week 8: Quarter-Final (5/6 November)
Theme: Judges' Challenge
Celebrity performers: Johnny Ruffo ("Take It Home") and Kesha ("Die Young")
Group performance: "Turn Up the Love"

Judges' vote to eliminate
 Bassingthwaighte: The Collective – backed her own act, Shiane Hawke.
 Keating: Shiane Hawke – backed his own act, The Collective.
 Mel B: Shiane Hawke – stated that she wanted The Collective to improve.
 Sebastian: Shiane Hawke – stated that although Hawke had potential as an artist, The Collective could go further in the competition.

Notes
On 11 November 2012, the performances of two finalists entered the ARIA Singles Chart. Bella Ferraro's performance of "Dreams" debuted at number 82, and The Collective's performance of "Beauty and a Beat" debuted at number 94. Samantha Jade's performance of "Stronger (What Doesn't Kill You)" debuted at number 96 on 18 November 2012.

Week 9: Semi-Final (12/13 November)
 Theme: Power and Passion
 Celebrity performers: Sam and the Womp ("Bom Bom") and Elton John vs. Pnau ("Sad" and "Good Morning to the Night")

Judges' votes to send through to the grand final
Keating: The Collective – backed his own act, The Collective.
Bassingthwaighte: Bella Ferraro – backed her own act, Bella Ferraro.
Mel B: Bella Ferraro – stated that Ferraro had improved more.
Sebastian: The Collective – could not decide and sent the result to deadlock.

With the acts in the bottom two receiving two votes each, the result went to deadlock and reverted to the earlier public vote. The Collective advanced to the final as the act with the most public votes.

Notes
For the first time this season, each act performed two songs.
Also for the first time, the judges chose which act in the bottom two they wanted to see progress to the grand final.
On 18 November 2012, the performances of three finalists entered the ARIA Singles Chart. Samantha Jade's performances of "Heartless" and "Where Have You Been" debuted at numbers 12 and 51, respectively. The Collective's performance of "Apologize" debuted at number 47 and their performance of "Yeah 3x" debuted at number 72. Bella Ferraro's performance of "The Last Day On Earth" debuted at number 90.

Week 10: Final (19/20 November)
19 November
Celebrity performer: Guy Sebastian ("Get Along") 
Group performance: "On the Floor" (performed by all contestants except Josh Brooks and Adil Memon)

The Collective received the fewest public votes and were automatically eliminated.

20 November
Celebrity performers: One Direction ("Little Things")
Group performances: 
"I Can Only Imagine" (performed by top 3 contestants)
"Good Time" with Owl City (performed with the contestants except Josh Brooks and Adil Memon)
"End of the Road" with Boyz II Men (performed with top three finalists)

Notes
For the first time this season there was no theme.

Charity single
The finalists recorded a cover of Carly Rae Jepsen's "Call Me Maybe" as a charity single in aid of Sony Foundation's You Can program which aims "to build specialised and age-appropriate youth cancer centres across Australia." The single was made available for download via the iTunes Store on 18 September 2012, after all twelve finalists performed the song on the first live results show that same day. It is the first time on X Factor Australia that finalists have released a charity single.

Winner's single
On 16 November 2012, the Herald Sun reported that the winner's singles for the top three finalists, Samantha Jade, The Collective and Jason Owen, were written by Australian songwriting and production duo DNA Songs. Jade's single was "What You've Done to Me", The Collective's single was "Surrender", and Owen's single was "Make It Last". Each finalist performed their song during the grand final performance show on 19 November. After Jade was announced as the winner, "What You've Done to Me" was released. It entered the ARIA Singles Chart at number one on 26 November. Two days after The X Factor ended, it was announced that The Collective and Owen both signed recording contracts with Sony Music Australia and would release "Surrender" and "Make It Last" as their debut singles.

The X Factor: One Direction to Superstardom
The X Factor: One Direction to Superstardom was a television special that aired on the Seven Network on 27 September 2012. The special followed the rise of One Direction, from their journey during the seventh series of The X Factor UK to becoming global superstars of today. It also featured One Direction's interview with X Factor Australia host Luke Jacobz. Aside from One Direction, the special included success stories of X Factor UK series three winner Leona Lewis, X Factor Australia season three winner Reece Mastin and finalist Johnny Ruffo, as well as the judges' opinions about the show and its "capacity to create global singing sensations." One Direction to Superstardom was watched by 691,000 viewers and was ranked fifteenth overall for the night.

Reception

Contestants
On 20 September 2012, the Seven Network issued a statement saying that contestant Josh Brookes was disqualified from The X Factor because he "behaved in an inappropriate manner" on social media. A Twitcam video that was later uploaded to YouTube displays Brookes and contestant Adil Memon asking teenage girls for "sneaky banana pics", a phrase used by teenagers that means naked images. The Seven Network stated, "After a careful review of the incident, FremantleMedia Australia, producers of the program, together with Channel Seven, made a joint decision to remove him from the competition". During the second live performance show on 25 September, Mel B announced that Carmelo Munzone, who was eliminated during the "home visits" stage, was Brookes' replacement in the show.

Ratings
The premiere episode of The X Factor, which was broadcast on 20 August 2012, topped the night's overall ratings with 1,598,000 viewers. The next five episodes of auditions also ranked first on their respective nights. The first live performance show on 17 September 2012 gained 1,588,000 viewers and topped the night's overall ratings. The announcement of the winner during the grand final decider show on 20 November 2012 was watched by 1,921,000 viewers, making it the highest rated episode of the fourth season.

 Colour key:
  – Highest rating during the season
  – Lowest rating during the season

References

External links
 The X Factor at Yahoo!7

Season 4
2012 Australian television seasons
Australia 04